is a passenger railway station on the Yokosuka Line in Zushi, Kanagawa, Japan, operated by the East Japan Railway Company (JR East).

Lines
Zushi Station is served by the Yokosuka Line and also by Shōnan-Shinjuku Line through services. It lies 8.4 kilometers from the junction at Ōfuna Station, and 57.8 kilometers from Tokyo Station.

The station is also used by rolling stock delivered from the J-TREC factory in Kanazawa-ku, Yokohama via a JR Freight connecting line immediately south of the station.

Station layout
Zushi Station has an island platform and a side platform serving three tracks. Platform 1 is used for trains which originate or terminate at Zushi. The platforms are connected by two overpasses. The station has entrances on the north and south sides, designated "west" and "east" respectively. In August 2007, escalator and elevator facilities were completed and a new overpass was opened on the eastern (Higashi-Zushi) side. The west exit was moved somewhat to the west.

There is a Midori no Madoguchi staffed ticket office, automatic ticket vending machines, reserved ticket vending machines, automatic ticket gates, and automatic fare adjustment machines. Also, in the station, outside the ticket gates, there is a Newdays convenience store and a kōban (police box).

Platforms

 15-car Yokosuka Line trains bound for Kurihama have to split into 11-car and 4-car segments, as the section between Higashi-Zushi and Kurihama only allow at most 11-car trains (10-car at Taura), with the 11-car segment continuing onwards to Kurihama.

History
Zushi Station opened on June 16, 1889. The present station building, the third building on this site was completed in March 1969. The station came under the management of JR East upon the privatization of the Japanese National Railways (JNR) on April 1, 1987. Shonan-Shinjuku Line services started on 1 December 2001.

Passenger statistics
In fiscal 2019, the station was used by an average of 28,798 passengers daily (boarding passengers only). The passenger figures for previous years are as shown below.

Surrounding area
 Zushi·Hayama Station ( Keikyu Zushi Line)
 Zushi City Hall
 Seiwa Gakuin Junior & Senior High School
 Zushi Kasei Junior & Senior High School

See also
 List of railway stations in Japan

References

External links

 Zushi Station information   

Yokosuka Line
Shōnan-Shinjuku Line
Stations of East Japan Railway Company
Railway stations in Kanagawa Prefecture
Railway stations in Japan opened in 1889
Zushi, Kanagawa
Stations of Japan Freight Railway Company